Gerrans may refer to:

 Gerrans, Cornwall, England
 Gerrans Bay, Cornwall, England
 Philip Gerrans (born 1959), Australian philosopher
 Simon Gerrans (born 1980), Australian cyclist

See also
 Gerran